Isabel Rawsthorne (born Isabel Nicholas, 10 July 1912 – 27 January 1992), also known at various times as Isabel Delmer and Isabel Lambert, was a British painter, scenery and costume designer, and occasional artists' model. During the Second World War she worked in black propaganda. She was part of and flourished in an artistic bohemian society that included Jacob Epstein, Alberto Giacometti and Francis Bacon.

Life

Born Isabel Nicholas, the daughter of a master mariner, in the East End of London, she was raised in Liverpool and the Wirral. She studied at the Liverpool College of Art, won a scholarship to the Royal Academy in London and spent two years in the studio of the sculptor Jacob Epstein. She was the mother of Epstein's son Jackie (born 1934), and briefly assumed the name "Margaret Epstein" (the name of Epstein's wife) in order to register Jackie's birth.

Rawsthorne's first show was a sell-out, and by September 1934 she was living in Paris. She worked with André Derain, and lived and travelled for a time with Balthus and his wife. She was painted several times by Derain and Pablo Picasso. In 1936 she married her first husband, the foreign correspondent for the Daily Express, Sefton Delmer. The travel, parties and luxurious apartment in the Place Vendôme, never replaced her Left Bank life, however; and most days she made the long walk there and back. A lifelong socialist, she visited Spain while Delmer was reporting the Spanish Civil War.

Rawsthorne was at the heart of the Paris avant-garde and became involved with Alberto Giacometti. They shared many intellectual enthusiasms and a commitment to a modern form of representational painting. Her characteristically astonished gaze and defiant stance can be seen in the new kind of etiolated figure that Giacometti developed over the next decade. The onset of World War II forced Rawsthorne to leave Paris. She relinquished at least one ticket out and did not flee until the day the Germans arrived on 14 June 1940.

She remained with Delmer for the first part of the war, but they divorced in 1947. She maintained indirect links with France by working in intelligence and black propaganda for the Political Warfare Executive. During the Italian Campaign, she edited the magazine Il Mondo Libero. About this time, 1943–44, she encountered Francis Bacon within the arty set around the BBC, although they probably did not become intimate until a few years later. Rawsthorne's closest wartime friends appear to have been John Rayner (typographer, journalist and soldier (SOE), the photographer Joan Leigh Fermor (then Rayner), the Schiaparelli model Anna Phillips, and the composer Elizabeth Lutyens, but her social life encompassed many others including the poets Louis MacNeice and Dylan Thomas (she shared working quarters with Thomas), Ian Fleming, and old friends from Paris, Peter Rose Pulham, Peter Watson (editor of the journal Horizon) and the spy Donald Maclean.

Returning to Paris in 1945, Rawsthorne was re-united with Giacometti and lived with him for a short while, but they never married. She continued to be involved in the evolution of the figurative style associated with Existentialism. She socialised with Simone de Beauvoir, Jean-Paul Sartre, Jean Wahl and other intellectuals, and for a time lived a few doors away from the headquarters of the journal Les Temps Modernes. She also entertained the philosopher A. J. Ayer in Paris, saw Eduardo Paolozzi and Bacon, and had relationships with Georges Bataille and the composer René Leibowitz. In the winter of 1946/7 she withdrew to modest lodgings in the Indre to work alone. The composer Constant Lambert visited her in 1947 and they married later that year.

Following her second marriage, her base became London. Her art world associates, including Bacon and Lucian Freud, created a potent mix with a glitzier musical set, including the Sitwells, Lutyens, Frederick Ashton, Margot Fonteyn and Alan Rawsthorne. From 1949, she and Bacon showcased their figurative brand of modern art at the Hanover Gallery and she exhibited in group shows organised by the ICA and the British Council. She began a career as a designer for the Royal Ballet and the opera at Covent Garden and Sadler's Wells.

Lambert died in 1951 and Rawsthorne returned to Paris to paint. She continued to see Giacometti, but eventually married Alan Rawsthorne in 1951. They moved to a thatched cottage in rural Essex with a purpose built studio, near friends such as the politician Tom Driberg, poet Randall Swingler, artists Michael Ayrton and Biddy and Roy Noakes; Bacon had a house not far away. Six of Bacon's portraits of Rawsthorne were shown in his 1967 show, including Portrait of Isabel Rawsthorne. In all, between 1964 and 1970 he painted 14 images of her, including five triptychs. Giacometti died in 1966, Alan Rawsthorne in 1971, and Isabel Rawsthorne in 1992; Bacon outlived her by a few months. Apart from visits to London and Paris, Africa, Greece and Australia, and a short period in Cambridge (1972-3), she lived in the cottage for forty years - half of her life. She raised geese, a nod to her interest in Konrad Lorenz, and became involved in the emergent environmentalist movement. She and her last husband are buried in Thaxted churchyard.

Career
Rawsthorne's work was dominated by the body, primarily paintings of figures and animals. Her father supplied exotic creatures to British zoos and as a child she took to drawing these and other wildlife. Later she became interested in natural history and new ideas in Anthropology, Ecology and Ethology, such as those of her friends Michel Leiris and Georges Bataille. These inform the skeletal bird, fish and bat figures of her 1949 Hanover Gallery show, the haunting ape series, and her last, large Migration pictures.

Rawsthorne's two years with Epstein and their mutual enthusiasm for Rodin developed her ideas about vitalism and movement, but she never became part of British Neo-Romanticism. In Paris she continuing her studies of the nude at the liberal Académie de la Grande Chaumière. She associated with Giacometti, Tristan Tzara and the Surrealist circle but was committed to a figurative form of modern art which she called 'Quintessentialism'. She maintained connections to an alternative circle of representational artists including Francis Gruber and Peter Rose Pulham, as well as Balthus and Derain.  Her outlook was anti-idealist, intellectual and, like Giacometti, she saw painting from the real world as a challenge that could never be fully met.

During the 1940s Rawsthorne adapted animal, archaic and pre-historic imagery into motifs of birth, sexuality and death. She did not share the fashionable interest in the formal properties of Oceanic or Archaic art. Instead, she investigated the uncanny 'presence' achieved by ancient figures, especially Egyptian sculpture. She also studied this quality in Early Renaissance paintings, and in the evidence of the body itself, X-rays, skeletons, figures and animals she found in the countryside or drew in London Zoo.

In the 1950s and '60s her explorations of the embattled origins of art and life were adapted into designs for the ballet and opera, such as a Minoan Tiresias created for the ballet of the same name premiered in 1951 at Covent Garden, the last work of her husband Constant Lambert. She continued her studies of the body, in motion this time, in the practice rooms of the Royal Ballet. Over the next twenty years she painted images of Fonteyn, Rudolph Nureyev, Antoinette Sibley and other dancers which developed a vivacious new language of movement. In 1961 she worked from the figure and landscape in Nigeria shortly after its Independence, at the Zaria Art School with the artist Clifford Frith (grandson of William Powell Frith).

Rawsthorne explored the ambiguities of appearance through the theme of the double – for instance, reflections, such as those seen in the practice room mirrors. During the late 1960s and '70s, the deaths of Giacometti and Rawsthorne prompted her to refine these ideas in a set of ethereal double portraits juxtaposing living, dead and sculpted likenesses. These works returned to the matière relief effects of the early 1950s and exchanged ideas with Bacon and the sculptor Roy Noakes. Some of these new works and a selection of her innovative dancers were presented to the public at the Marlborough Gallery  in 1968.

From the 1950s onwards she developed a series of paintings based on the Essex countryside. Existential rather than pastoral, they responded to environmentalist publications such as Rachel Carson's Silent Spring. The last of these, Migrations, embed bird and animal motifs in timeless settings. The extraordinary brushwork and relief effects developed over a life-time of drawing in close association with sculptors, was combined with a new potency of colour and epic scale. Swathes of yellow evoke the deserts of pre-history and post-history, as well as the very immediate issue of the fields of oil seed rape that were appearing in the 1970s.

In later life, widely read biographies of Giacometti and Bacon brought Rawsthorne fame as a model and muse, but unfortunately had the effect of obscuring her main profession. By the 1980s she was better known as a once beautiful siren, or the bon viveur that Bacon partied with and painted as 'Isabel Rawsthorne'. Since her death, however, serious scholarship has ensued, several paintings have entered public collections<ref name=NPGir>{{cite web |url=http://www.npg.org.uk/collections/search/person.php?search=sa&OConly=true&sText=rawsthorne&LinkID=mp08058&role=art|title=Search the Collection: Isabel Rawsthorne (nee Nicholas) |accessdate=14 August 2017|work=National Portrait Gallery}}</ref> and retrospectives have been exhibited.

Exhibitions
 Isabel Nicholas: Animal Studies, Arnold Haskell's Valenza Gallery, London, 1933
 Watercolours by Paul Nash, Frank Dobson, P.H. Jowett, Adrian Allinson, Isabel Nicholas, Redfern Gallery, London, 1934
 Isabel Lambert: Recent Paintings, Hanover Gallery, London, 1949
 London-Paris (New Trends in Paintings and Sculpture), Institute of Contemporary Arts, London, 1950, 1955
 Isabel Lambert, Michael Ayrton, Milan, 1950
 Exhibition of Drawings, Institute of Contemporary Arts, London, 1951
 Recent Trends in Realist Painting, Institute of Contemporary Arts, London, 1952
 Exhibition of Paintings, Institute of Contemporary Arts, London, 1954
 Contemporary English Theatre Design, Arts Council of Great Britain, 1957
 Isabel Lambert - Recent Paintings, Hanover Gallery, London, 1959
 Three Stage Designers: Leslie Hurry, Isabel Lambert, Sophie Fedorovitch, Arts Council of Great Britain, 1963/64
 Dancers of the Royal Ballet: An Exhibition of Drawings and Gouaches by Isabel Lambert, Mermaid Theatre, London, 1966, Arts Council Gallery, Cambridge, 1967
 Isabel Lambert, Marlborough Fine Art, London, 1968
 Isabel Lambert: Exhibition of Work, Framlingham Art Gallery, Suffolk, 1974
 Isabel Lambert: Dancers in Action. Drawings, paintings, stage designs, October Gallery, London, 1986
 Exhibition of work, Fry Art Gallery, Saffron Walden, 1990
 Isabel Rawsthorne 1912–1992 A Memorial Retrospective, Woods Gallery, Leicester, 1992
 Isabel Rawsthorne 1912–1992 Paintings, Drawings and Designs, Mercer Art Gallery/October Gallery 1997-98
 Isabel Rawsthorne: Natural History, Oxford University Museum of Natural History, 1998–1999
 Transition: The London Art Scene in the Fifties, Barbican Art Gallery, 2002
 Epstein and Isabel: Artist and Muse, Harewood House, 2008.
 Friends and Lovers, Number 3, The Old Workhouse, Pateley Bridge, 2008-9
 Alberto Giacometti "Die Frau auf dem Wagen" Triumph und Tod, Lehmbruck Museum, Duisburg, 2010
 Migration, The Old Workhouse, Pateley Bridge, 2010
 Isabel Rawsthorne: Moving Bodies, The New Art Gallery Walsall, 2012
 Alberto Giacometti and Isabel Rawsthorne, a Conversation, Tate Britain, 2022
 The Many Sides of Isabel Rawsthorne: the story of a local and international artist, Fry Art Gallery, 2022

Theatre design
 Tiresias, Sadler's Wells Ballet, 1951
 Elektra, Sadler's Wells Opera, 1953
 Blood Wedding, Sadler's Wells Ballet, 1953
 Coppélia, Sadler's Wells Ballet, 1953
 Life's a Dream, The Group Theatre, 1953
 Madame Chrysanthème, Sadler's Wells Ballet, 1955
 Jabez and the Devil, The Royal Ballet, 1961

Further reading
 P Rose Pulham, 'Isabel Lambert' Isabel Lambert, catalogue, London: Hanover Gallery, 1949
 J Lord 'Sudbury Cottage', A Gift for Admiration, Further Memoirs, Farrar Straus & Giroux, New York, 1998
 V Wiesinger, Alberto Giacometti, Isabel Nicholas, Correspondences, Paris: FAAG, 2007
 V Wiesinger and M Harrison, Isabel and Other Intimate Strangers, New York: Gagosian Gallery, 2008
 Carol Jacobi, 'Muse and Maker: Isabel Lambert and Alberto Giacometti' Alberto Giacometti "Die Frau auf dem Wagen"Triumph und Tod, catalogue ed. Veronique Wiesinger and Gottlieb Leinz, Duisburg Museum, Germany, Jan 2010
 Carol Jacobi, Out of the Cage: The Art of Isabel Rawsthorne, London: The Estate of Francis Bacon Publishing, Feb 2021

References

External links
 
 Interview, Woman's Hour, BBC Radio 4 
 Ballet designs Royal Opera House The Chariot'', Lehmbruck Museum 
 Photograph of Isabel Lambert (Rawsthorne), The Estate of Francis Bacon 

1912 births
1992 deaths
20th-century English women artists
Alumni of Liverpool College of Art
Alumni of the Académie de la Grande Chaumière
Alumni of the Royal Academy Schools
Artists from Liverpool
English artists' models
Modern painters